Sierra Club of Canada v Canada (Minister of Finance) is a Supreme Court of Canada decision, which was reached in 2002, when a Non-Governmental Organization (or "NGO") sought judicial review of the federal government’s decision to provide financial assistance to a Crown corporation (in this case, for the sale of nuclear reactors and construction thereof). The Crown corporation requested a confidentiality order in respect of certain documents, and the NGO contested the request. The proper analytical approach to be applied to exercise of judicial discretion where a litigant seeks confidentiality order is now known as the Sierra Club test. The deleterious effects of granting a confidentiality order include a negative effect on the open court principle were noted by Iacobucci J. but they were outweighed by the salutary effects of the grant.

The case is also known as Atomic Energy of Canada Limited v. Sierra Club of Canada.

Sierra Club test

See also
 Dagenais v Canadian Broadcasting Corp
 R v Mentuck

References

Supreme Court of Canada cases
2002 in Canadian case law
Freedom of information in Canada
Nuclear power in Canada
Atomic Energy of Canada Limited
Publication bans in Canadian case law